The 2019 BSWW Mundialito was a beach soccer tournament that took place at Praia da Nazaré in Nazaré, Portugal, from 13 August to 15 August 2019. This competition with 4 teams was played in a round-robin format.

Participating nations

 (host)

 (debut)

Standings

Schedule and results

Winners

Awards

See also
Beach soccer
BSWW Mundialito
Euro Beach Soccer League

References

External links
Beach Soccer Worldwide

BSWW Mundialito
BSW
2019 in beach soccer
BSWW